Mesostygarctus is a genus of tardigrades, in the family Stygarctidae. It was first described and named by Jeanne Renaud-Mornant in 1979.

Species
The genus includes two species:
 Mesostygarctus intermedius Renaud-Mornant, 1979
 Mesostygarctus spiralis Hansen, Kristensen & Jørgensen, 2012

References

Publications
Renaud-Mornant, 1979 : Tardigrades marins de Madagascar. 2. Stygarctidae et Oreellidae. 3. Considérations écologiques générales. [Underwater Tardigrades of Madagascar, 2. Stygarctidae and Oreellidae, 3. General Ecological Considerations] Bulletin du Muséum National d'Histoire Naturelle Section A Zoologie Biologie et Écologie Animales ser. 4, vol. 1, no. 2, p. 339-351.

Stygarctidae
Tardigrade genera